is a Japanese whisky distillery.

In 1981, it was expanded by the commissioning of a second Hakushu East site, near the original site, now called Hakushu West. All production is now focused on the new site.

Bottlings
Hakushu is produced in the following bottlings:

Main range:

 Hakushu Single Malt "Distiller's Reserve" (New 2014 addition to the core range), 43%; 
 Hakushu Single Malt 12 years 43%;
 Hakushu Single Malt 18 years 43%;
 Hakushu Single Malt 25 years 43%.

Limited series:
 2013: Heavily Peated 48%;
 2014: Sherry Cask 48%.

References

External links

Suntory Hakushu Distillery – official site
The Hakushu Single Malt Whisky – official site 

This article is based upon a translation of the French language version as at May 2014.

Distilleries in Japan
Japanese whisky
Companies based in Yamanashi Prefecture
1973 establishments in Japan
Japanese brands
Suntory